Dorymyrmex confusus is a species of ant in the genus Dorymyrmex. Described by Kusnezov in 1952, the species is endemic to Argentina.

References

Dorymyrmex
Hymenoptera of South America
Insects described in 1952